Inkinga platystoma is a species of sea snail, a marine gastropod mollusk in the family Horaiclavidae.

Description
The length of the shell attains 13 mm, its diameter 5 mm.

The elongate turreted shell contains 7 whorls. The two apical whorls are remarkably large. The faint nodules at the top of the whorls and the more distinct ones around the middle have faint dots of brown between them. The spiral striae are interrupted by them. The aperture is large and almost square. It equals about 5/13 of the total length of the shell. The sinus is large and moderately deep. The siphonal canal is open and very short.

Distribution
This species occurs in the demersal zone off the Cape of Good Hope to Eastern Transkei, South Africa.

References

External links
  Tucker, J.K. 2004 Catalog of recent and fossil turrids (Mollusca: Gastropoda). Zootaxa 682:1–1295

platystoma
Gastropods described in 1877